John Hnatyshyn  (January 20, 1907 in – May 2, 1967) was a Ukrainian Canadian lawyer, Senator and father of Ray Hnatyshyn, the twenty-fourth governor general of Canada.

Early life and career 
Born in the mostly Ukrainian northern part of the Austro-Hungarian Duchy of Bukovina, the son of Michael and Anna, Hnatyshyn came to Canada when he was two months old. Raised on a farm near Canora, Saskatchewan, he received a Bachelor of Arts degree in 1930 and a Bachelor of Law degree in 1932 from the University of Saskatchewan. He was called to the Saskatchewan bar in 1933 and practised law in Saskatoon, co-founding the firm of Kyle, Ferguson and Hnatyshyn in 1942 and becoming Queen's Counsel in 1957.

While attending university in Saskatoon, he resided at the Petro Mohyla Ukrainian Institute, where he met Helen Pitts. They married in 1931 and had four children: Ramon, Victor, David and Elizabeth.

Politics 
In the 1935, 1940 and 1945 federal elections, he tried unsuccessfully to get elected to the House of Commons of Canada as a Conservative candidate for the riding of Yorkton. He also ran unsuccessfully for the provincial legislature as a Progressive Conservative candidate for Saskatoon City in 1952.

In 1959, he was appointed by John Diefenbaker to the Senate representing the senatorial division of Saskatoon, Saskatchewan, becoming Canada's first Ukrainian-born senator. He died in office in 1967.

Notes

References

External links 
 

1907 births
1967 deaths
Canadian people of Ukrainian descent
Canadian senators from Saskatchewan
Conservative Party of Canada (1867–1942) candidates for the Canadian House of Commons
Progressive Conservative Party of Canada candidates for the Canadian House of Commons
Candidates in the 1945 Canadian federal election
Progressive Conservative Party of Canada senators
People from Canora, Saskatchewan
University of Saskatchewan College of Law alumni
Canadian King's Counsel